FK Birlik Konçe (FK Birlik Konche) is a football club based in the village of Konche near Radovish, North Macedonia. They currently play in the OFS Radovish league.

History
The club was founded in 1993.

References

External links

Club info at MacedonianFootball 
Football Federation of Macedonia 

Birlik Konče
Association football clubs established in 1993
1993 establishments in the Republic of Macedonia
FK